Cudhi is a former municipality in the Durrës County, western Albania. At the 2015 local government reform it became a subdivision of the municipality Krujë. The population at the 2011 census was 1,812.

Demographic history
Cudhi (Çizin) appears in the Ottoman defter of 1467 as a hass-ı mir-liva property in the vilayet of Akçahisar. The settlement had a total of seven households represented by the following household heads: Martin Çataj, Dimitri Bardi, Martin Çataj, Vlad Shtjafni, Gjergj Bozhaj, Oliver Indi, and Gjon Ozguri.

References

Administrative units of Krujë
Former municipalities in Durrës County
Populated places disestablished in 2015